Frederick Deshune House (born January 4, 1978) is an American retired professional basketball player.

High school
House attended Ellison High School, in his native Killeen, Texas.

College career
House played college basketball at Dixie State College of Utah, before transferring to Southern Utah University (SUU). He played two years with the Southern Utah Thunderbirds, averaging 16.4 points, 5.9 rebounds and 3.2 steals per game.

As a junior, he led SUU in scoring (14.8 ppg) and rebounding (5.9 rpg). As a senior, he started all 31 games and led the team in scoring 15 times, averaging 17.8 points per game.

Professional career
After graduation from college, House spent the 2001–02 season with North Charleston Lowgators of the NBA Development League (NBDL), where he was named the league's Rookie of the Year. He averaged 13.4 ppg and 4.5 rpg in 56 starts in helping lead the club to an NBDL-best 36–20 regular season mark and a berth in the NBDL Finals. Later in 2002, he also played for the Adirondack Wildcats of the United States Basketball League (USBL).

In the 2002–03 season, House began his overseas career, signing for ex-European champions Partizan from Serbia. He scored a EuroLeague career-high 39 points in a game against Cibona on November 27, 2003. He also led the 2003–04 Euroleague in steals with 3.3 per game.

From 2004 and 2006, House played for the Lithuanian team Lietuvos rytas.

In the 2006–07 season, he reached the EuroLeague Final Four with TAU Cerámica. In the next 2007–08 season, he reached the ULEB Cup Final Eight with Pamesa Valencia.

After two years in Spain, House moved to Russia and played for Lokomotiv Rostov in the 2008–09 season. In November 2009, he signed with the Ukrainian team Azovmash for the 2009–10 season. In the next summer, he extended his contract for another one, the 2010–11 season. House signed with BC Dnipro for the 2011–12 season, but was released after few games due to injury problems.

In November 2012, he was acquired by the Texas Legends.

In August 2013, House signed with Peja of the Balkan League.

Career statistics

EuroLeague

|-
| style="text-align:left;"| 2002–03
| style="text-align:left;"| Partizan
| 10 || 9 || 27.5 || .458 || .190 || .675 || 3.1 || 1.6 || 2.3 || .1 || 9.3 || 7.4
|-
| style="text-align:left;"| 2003–04
| style="text-align:left;"| Partizan
| 13 || 13 || 35.2 || .435 || .206 || .659 || 6.1 || 1.3 || style="background:#CFECEC;"|3.4 || .4 || 15.5 || 13.2
|-
| style="text-align:left;"| 2005–06
| style="text-align:left;"| Lietuvos rytas
| 19 || 19 || 26.3 || .427 || .353 || .754 || 3.2 || 1.4 || 1.9 || .1 || 11.9 || 8.9
|-
| style="text-align:left;"| 2006–07
| style="text-align:left;"| TAU Cerámica
| 20 || 18 || 23.1 || .500 || .177 || .763 || 4.5 || 1.2 || 2.3 || .1 || 6.5 || 7.8

References

External links

 Fred House at acb.com
 Fred House at euroleague.net
 Fred House at fiba.com

1978 births
Living people
20th-century African-American sportspeople
21st-century African-American sportspeople
African-American basketball players
American expatriate basketball people in Kosovo
American expatriate basketball people in Lithuania
American expatriate basketball people in Russia
American expatriate basketball people in Serbia
American expatriate basketball people in Spain
American expatriate basketball people in Ukraine
American men's basketball players
Basketball players from Texas
BC Azovmash players
BC Dnipro players
BC Rytas players
Charleston Lowgators players
Utah Tech Trailblazers men's basketball players
Junior college men's basketball players in the United States
KB Peja players
KK Partizan players
Liga ACB players
PBC Lokomotiv-Kuban players
People from Killeen, Texas
Saski Baskonia players
Shooting guards
Small forwards
Southern Utah Thunderbirds men's basketball players
Texas Legends players
Valencia Basket players